Julio Cobos Moreno (born 10 February 1971) is a Spanish retired footballer who played as a winger, and is the current manager of CP Cacereño.

Club career
Born in Santa Amalia, Badajoz, Extremadura, Cobos played amateur football well into his 20s. In the 1996 summer he joined Xerez CD in Segunda División B, achieving promotion in his first season.

On 5 October 1997 Cobos played his first professional match, starting in a 3–0 home win against CD Leganés in the Segunda División. He scored his first goal ten days later, in a 4–1 home routing over Levante UD.

In the 2000 summer Cobos moved to Tercera División club CP Cacereño, achieving promotion in the 2001–02 season. He later resumed his career in the lower levels, representing CF Extremadura, CD Don Benito and CD Santa Amalia, retiring with the latter in 2011, aged 40.

Managerial career
Shortly after retiring, Cobos returned to his former club Cacereño, acting as Pedro Braojos' assistant manager. On 14 July 2012 he was appointed manager, as the latter was sacked.

On 12 June 2013 Cobos was named CF Villanovense manager. He took the club back to the third level at first attempt, finishing first in their group. In June, 2019 he was appointed the head coach of CP Cacereño, playing in Tercera División.

Managerial statistics

References

External links

1971 births
Living people
People from Las Vegas Altas
Sportspeople from the Province of Badajoz
Spanish footballers
Footballers from Extremadura
Association football wingers
Segunda División players
Segunda División B players
Tercera División players
CD Badajoz players
Sevilla Atlético players
Xerez CD footballers
CP Cacereño players
CF Extremadura footballers
Spanish football managers
CP Cacereño managers
CF Villanovense managers